Soti Triantafyllou or Triantafillou (born 1957) is a Greek writer, columnist, translator, and political/social commentator. She is based in Athens and Paris.

Education 
Soti Triantafyllou was born in downtown Athens (Fokionos Negri). She attended English-Hellenic Elementary School and graduated from Arsakeion High School. Her further education includes: Diplôme d’Etudes de Lettres et Civilisation Françaises, Université de Nice, Faculté des Lettres et Sciences Humaines, Nice, France (1979), Bachelor of Science; Faculty of Pharmacy, University of Athens, Athens, Greece (Oct.1979), Diplôme d’Etudes Approfondies (DEA), Faculty of History and Civilizations, Ecole des Hautes Etudes en Sciences Sociales, Paris (with professor Marc Ferro), France (1981), PhD, American History and Civilization, Ecole des Hautes Etudes en Sciences Sociales, Paris (thesis on “The Image of the U.S. Through the Hollywood Comedy 1946-1960” with Professor Marc Ferro), France (1984), PhD, History of American Cities, NYU (Thesis “Los Angeles, California and Athens, Greece: Urban Patterns” with professor Jean Heffer) (1989). She did post-doctoral research at the Centre Koyre in Paris (History and Philosophy of Mathematics) and at the EHESS (Russian Studies).

Career 
Soti Triantafyllou has worked as a political columnist for 35 years. She has contributed to most Greek dailies and magazines writing about international politics and, occasionally, about cars. She has also worked as professor of history and film studies at the Hellenic Film School, (1985-2000) and she has been a visiting lecturer at the University of Western Macedonia (Creative Writing) and at Aegean University (Faculty of Geography and Urbanism, Mytilene, Greece (2004-2007)), at the University of Athens (Strategic Studies). Her academic work includes the project “The Image of Los Angeles in the Movies” (with Professor Jean Heffer) for the Centre d’Etudes Nord-Américaines, Paris, France (1984-1985). Her 10th novel, "Rare Earths", came out in October 2013. She is trilingual (Greek, English, French) and she translates from four languages including Italian and German.
She won the 2018 National Award for Novel for her work The End of the World in an English Garden (Patakis 2017). Soti Triantafyllou is a militant atheist.

In 2010 she talked with Süddeutsche Zeitung about the skepticism of the Greek people following the election of Giorgos Papandreou.

Awards 
Premio Alziator for Chinese Boxes, 2007
Queer Award for best play  Mechanic Falls (staged by Stamatis Patronis), 2014
Konstantinos Kalligas for Journalism, 2017
National Library Award for Best Novel The End of the World in an English Garden, 2019

References 

1957 births
Living people
Writers from Athens
Greek women writers